The California Environmental Protection Agency, or CalEPA, is a state cabinet-level agency within the government of California. The mission of CalEPA is to restore, protect and enhance the environment, to ensure public health, environmental quality and economic vitality.

The current Secretary for Environmental Protection (Secretary of CalEPA) is Yana Garcia, (formerly Jared Blumenfeld), and is a member of Governor Gavin Newsom's cabinet. The Office of the Secretary heads CalEPA and is responsible for overseeing and coordinating the activities of one office, two boards, and three departments dedicated to improving California's environment.

The Secretary of CalEPA is also directly responsible for coordinating the administration of the Unified Program and certifying Unified Program Agencies. The CalEPA Unified Program coordinates, and makes consistent the administrative requirements, permits, inspections, and enforcement activities of six environmental and emergency response programs. The state agencies responsible for these programs set the standards for their program while local governments implement the standards. To date, there are 83 Certified Unified Program Agencies (CUPAs), who are accountable for carrying out responsibilities previously handled by approximately 1,300 different state and local agencies.

CalEPA should not be confused with the similarly named federal United States Environmental Protection Agency (EPA).

History
CalEPA was created by Governor Pete Wilson by Executive Order W-5-91 in 1991, following on a "Big Green" initiative Wilson proposed during the 1990 state gubernatorial elections, promising a cabinet-level agency to oversee state environmental regulations and research. Following inter-agency reorganizations led by the governor with review by both houses of the California State Legislature, the agency became a cabinet department on July 17, 1991. As of 2019, the statutory creation of the agency is in Government Code section 12800.

CalEPA, and its departmental California Air Resources Board, were one of the key supporters of the Global Warming Solutions Act of 2006, making the state the first in the United States to cap all greenhouse gas emissions from major industries.

In June 2008, CalEPA announced that new global warming performance labels would be placed on all new cars effective on January 1, 2009. The stickers will provide two scores: a smog score and a global warming score with a grade from 1 to 10, where the higher the grade, the more environmentally friendly the vehicle.

Executive Management
 Yana Garcia, Secretary for Environmental Protection (Secretary of CalEPA) – appointed by Governor Gavin Newsom. Started role in September 2022. Formerly Jared Blumenfeld, Secretary for Environmental Protection (Secretary of CalEPA) – appointed by Governor Gavin Newsom in January 2019. Retired 2022.
 Serena McIlwain, Undersecretary for Environmental Protection (Undersecretary of CalEPA)

Deputy/Assistant Secretaries
 Alexa Kleysteuber, Deputy Secretary for Border and Intergovernmental Relations 
 Alex Barnum, Deputy Secretary for Communications and External Affairs
 Christiana Tiedemann, Deputy Secretary for Law Enforcement and Counsel
 Ashley Conrad-Saydah, Deputy Secretary for Climate Policy
 Grant Cope, Deputy Secretary for Environmental Policy
 Christine Hironaka, Deputy Secretary for Legislative Affairs
 Gina Solomon, Deputy Secretary for Science and Health
 Jason Boetzer, Assistant Secretary for Local Program Coordination and Emergency Response
 Eric Jarvis, Assistant Secretary for Fiscal & Administrative Programs
 Christie Vosburg, Assistant General Counsel for Enforcement
 Yana Garcia, Assistant Secretary for Environmental Justice and Tribal Affairs 
 Alejandro Rodarte, Assistant Secretary for Border Affairs
 John Blue, Manager of Climate Programs 
 Sergio Gutierrez, Agency Chief Information Officer

Boards, Departments, and Offices

Office of the Secretary
California Air Resources Board (ARB)
Department of Pesticide Regulation (DPR)
California Department of Resources, Recycling and Recovery (CalRecycle)
Department of Toxic Substances Control (DTSC)
Office of Environmental Health Hazard Assessment (OEHHA)
State Water Resources Control Board (SWRCB)

The California Integrated Waste Management Board, that focused on recycling and waste reduction, ceased in 2010. It was succeeded by the California Department of Resources Recycling and Recovery—CalRecycle, also under CalEPA.

See also
California Department of Conservation
Climate change in California
Environment of California
Environmentalism
Kyoto Protocol
Pollution in California
United States Environmental Protection Agency

References

External links
Calepa.ca.gov: Official California Environmental Protection Agency website

 
Environment of California
Environmental Protection Agency
State environmental protection agencies of the United States
Government agencies established in 1991
1991 establishments in California